Kumbum Monastery (THL Kumbum Jampa Ling), also called Ta'er Temple, is a Tibetan gompa in Lusar, Huangzhong County, Xining, Qinghai, China. It was founded in 1583 in a narrow valley close to the village of Lusar in the historical Tibetan region of Amdo. Its superior monastery is Drepung Monastery, immediately to the west of Lhasa. It is ranked in importance as second only to Lhasa.

Description
Alexandra David-Néel, the famous Belgian-French explorer who spent more than two years studying and translating Tibetan books at the monastery, said of it:

Origins: The Tree of Great Merit
Je Tsongkhapa, the founder of the Gelug school of Tibetan Buddhism, was born in nearby Tsongkha in 1357. According to one tradition, Tsongkhapa's father took the afterbirth and buried it where the monastery is now and soon a sandalwood tree grew on the spot. Another version has it that the tree grew up where drops of blood from Tsongkhapa's umbilical cord had fallen on the ground. In any case this tree became known as the "Tree of Great Merit." The leaves and the bark of this tree were reputed to bear impressions of the Buddha's face and various mystic syllables and its blossoms were said to give off a peculiarly pleasing scent.

The four-storied golden-roofed temple built around the tree where Tsongkhapa is said to have been born is called "Golden Tree" (metaphorically "wish-fulfilling tree") and is considered the holiest place at Kumbum.
 This is the origin of its Chinese name, Little Tower Temple.

Two Catholic missionaries, Évariste Régis Huc and Joseph Gabet who arrived here in the 1840s when the tree was still living were fully prepared to dismiss "The Tree of Great Merit" as just another fanciful legend.Section of this tree are now preserved in a stupa in the Great Golden Temple.

History

Foundation

In the 1360s Tsongkhapa's mother, with the help of locals, had a small temple with a stupa built on the site of his birthplace.

In 1560 the meditator Tsöndrü Gyeltsen built a small monastery there called Gonpalung for intensive meditation practice. At first, it had seven monks at a time, but soon expanded to hold fifteen.

In 1576, Altan Khan (1507–1583) of the Tümed Mongols invited the future 3rd Dalai Lama, Sönam Gyatso (1543–1588) to bring Buddhism to Mongolia. After Altan Khan adopted Buddhism, he gave Sönam Gyatso the title Dalai Lama: Dalai is the Mongolian translation of the name Gyatso "ocean."

On his way to meet Altan Khan near Qinghai Lake, the 3rd Dalai Lama stopped at the isolated retreat by the holy tree marking the spot where Tsongkhapa had been born. He requested Tsöndrü Gyeltsen to construct a larger monastery at this site and appointed him as the head lama. The monastery was built completely in 1583 and a fence was erected around the "Tree of Great Merit". An annual Monlam Prayer Festival was inaugurated, like the one held in Lhasa. The new monastery was called Kumbum Jampa Ling. "Kumbum" means "100,000 enlightening bodies of the Buddha". It is named after the 100,000 images of Siṃhanāda which appear on the leaves of the holy sandalwood tree. "Jampa ling" means "Maitreya Cloister." This refers to the Maitreya temple built by  Tsöndrü Gyeltsen to the right of the precious tree.

The first Throne Holder of Kumbum was Düldzin Özer Gyatso (born 1557). In 1603, the 4th Dalai Lama (1589–1616) stopped at Kumbum on his way from his native Mongolia to Ü-Tsang. At that time, he proclaimed the need for a study division to be built and for Düldzin Özer Gyatso to be appointed as the head of the entire monastery. At Kumbum's Monlam of 1612, Düldzin Özer Gyatso first ascended to the throne of abbot and opened a debate college.

By the middle of the 20th century, Kumbum Monastery included thirty temples and a thousand or so houses.

The Hui General Ma Bufang patronized the Choekyi Gyaltsen, 10th Panchen Lama and the Nyingma against the Dalai Lama. Qinghai served as a "sanctuary" for Nyingma members. Ma Bufang allowed Kumbum Monastery to be totally self-governed by the Panchen Lama.

Monastic colleges

Kumbum has four monastic colleges or faculties (dratsang). The largest is the Debate College or Faculty for Logic, the Shadupling Dratsang. Most of its divisions use the textbooks of Jetsunpa Chokyi-gyeltsen  (1469–1544), as at Ganden Jangtsey and Sera Jey Colleges  near Lhasa. A few of the divisions follow the textbooks of Kunkyen Jamyang-zhaypa Ngawang-tsondru (1648–1722), as at Gomang College of Drepung Monastery and Labrang Monastery. The highest degrees of Geshe Rabjampa and Geshe Shayrampa are awarded at the Kumbum Monlam Prayer Festival each year.

Gyüpa Dratsang, the Tantric College, or Sangngag Dechenling Datsang was founded by Chojey Legpa-gyatso in 1649. The curriculum follows that of Gyumay Lower Tantric College of Lhasa. After study of the major texts and commentaries of the Guhyasamāja tantra, Cakrasaṃvara Tantra and Vajrabhairava tantra, monks receive the geshe ngagrampa degree.

In 1711, Chuzang Lozang-tenpay-gyeltsen built a new Tantric College, Ngagpa Dratsang. In 1723, the Qing armies severely damaged the four great monasteries of the Qinghai region – Kumbum, Gonlung, Serkog and Chuzang and many monks fled. Soon afterwards, the Qing commander asked the 21st Throne Holder to convert the new Ngagpa Dratsang into a Medical College, and this was done. With the appointment of several famous doctors, the Medical College, Menpa Dratsang Sorig-dargyey-zhenpen-norbuling was opened in 1725. It became a separate college during the time of the 22nd Throne Holder. The doctors who are graduated receive the Menrampa degree.

The fourth college at Kumbum is the Kalachakra College, Dükhor Dratsang or Dukor Dratsang Rigden Losel ling. It was founded in 1820 by Ngawang Shedrub Tenpé Nyima. Monks at this college also study astrology and receive the tsirampa degree upon completion of their education.

Current situation

Before 1958, Kumbum had 3600 monks. At present, there are 400, as the monastery was affected by Chinese Communist policies since the late 1950s. Of these, 300 are at the Debate College and the rest are distributed evenly among the other three colleges. Traditionally, the majority of the Kumbum monks have been Tibetans from Amdo, as at Labrang Monastery. The remainder have been Khalkha Mongols from Mongolia or Inner Mongolia, Upper Mongols from Amdo east of Kumbum or Yugurs from Gansu.

Kumbum is still a major pilgrimage for Vajrayana believers and scholars, visited by many thousands of people a year. The Arjia tulkus are traditionally given the position of abbot of Kumbum. The 8th Arjia Rinpoche went into exile in the United States in 1998. He is currently developing an exile campus of Kumbum Monastery in Bloomington, Indiana, known as Kumbum Chamtse Ling or Kumbum West.

The Kumbum monastery is still very much a repository of Tibetan culture and art, including various sculptures, statues and religious artifacts. It certainly is a repository of the Western respect for Tibet, as so many wayfarers from the West apart from David-Néel (Paul Pelliot, Ella Maillart, Peter Fleming, Evariste Huc, André Migot) have spent time there.

References

Further reading
 Arjia Rinpoche (Lobsang Tubten Jigme Gyatso) (2010) Surviving the Dragon: a Tibetan Lama's Account of 40 Years Under Chinese Rule. Emmaus, Pa.: Rodale.
 Bell, Charles Alfred. (1987) Portrait of a Dalai Lama: a Biography of the Great Thirteenth. London: Wisdom.
 Bell, Charles (1924) Tibet: Past and Present. Oxford: Clarendon Press
 Bell, Charles (1931) The Religion of Tibet. Oxford: Clarendon Press
 Tsering, Diki, and Khedroob Thondup. (2001) Dalai Lama, My Son: a Mother's Story. New York: Compass Books.
 Gyalo Thondup and Anne F. Thurston, (2015) The Noodle Maker of Kalimpong. London: Rider
 Harrer, Heinrich (1954) Seven Years in Tibet. (translated from the German by Richard Graves; with an introduction by Peter Fleming; foreword by the Dalai Lama), New York: E. P. Dutton, 1954, 
 Huc, Evariste Régis, Joseph Gabet, and Paul Pelliot (1928) Huc and Gabet: travels in Tartary, Thibet and China, 1844-1846. New York: Harper & Brothers.
 Laird, Thomas (2007) The Story of Tibet: Conversations with the Dalai Lama. London: Atlantic. 
 Mullin, Glenn H (1988) The Thirteenth Dalai Lama: Path of the Bodhisattva Warrior Ithaca, New York: Snow Lion. 
 Mullin, Glenn H. (2001) The Fourteen Dalai Lamas: A Sacred Legacy of Reincarnation, Santa Fe, New Mexico.: Clear Light Publishers. 
 Richardson, Hugh E. (1984) Tibet & its History. Boulder and London: Shambala. 
 Smith, Warren (1997) Tibetan Nation. New Delhi: HarperCollins. 
 Thubten Jigme Norbu (1965) Tibet is My Country; the Autobiography of Thubten Jigme Norbu, Brother of the Dalai Lama, as Told to Heinrich Harrer. New York: Dutton.

External links

Moving West and the Kumbum Monastery
 Kumbum Jampa Ling - at The Treasury of Lives
Kumbum Monastery

Gelug monasteries
Tibetan Buddhist temples in Qinghai
Buddhist temples in Xining
1583 establishments in China
Religious organizations established in the 1580s
Amdo
Major National Historical and Cultural Sites in Qinghai
Buddhist monasteries in Qinghai